Dell EMC (EMC Corporation until 2016) is an American multinational corporation headquartered in Hopkinton, Massachusetts and Round Rock, Texas, United States. Dell EMC sells data storage, information security, virtualization, analytics, cloud computing and other products and services that enable organizations to store, manage, protect, and analyze data. Dell EMC's target markets include large companies and small- and medium-sized businesses across various vertical markets.  The company's stock (as EMC Corporation) was added to the New York Stock Exchange on April 6, 1986, and was also listed on the S&P 500 index.

EMC was acquired by Dell in 2016; at that time, Forbes noted EMC's "focus on developing and selling data storage and data management hardware and software and convincing its customers to buy its products independent of their other IT buying decisions" based on "best-of-breed." It was later renamed to Dell EMC. Dell uses the EMC name with some of its products.

Prior to its acquisition by Dell, EMC had, in 2008, acquired Iomega; Dell EMC formed a partnership with Lenovo in 2013, as LenovoEMC, that superseded and rebranded Iomega.

History

EMC, founded in 1979 by Richard Egan and Roger Marino (the E and M of EMC), introduced its first 64-kilobyte (65,536 bytes) memory boards for the Prime Computer in 1981. EMC continued to develop memory boards for other computer types. In the mid-1980s, the company expanded beyond memory to other computer data storage types and networked storage platforms. EMC began shipping its flagship product, the Symmetrix, in 1990.

While some of EMC's growth is credited to acquisitions of smaller companies, Symmetrix was the main factor in EMC's rapid growth during the 1990s, from a firm valued in the hundreds of millions of dollars to a multi-billion dollar company.

In 2009 EMC signed a two-year deal to be the principal shirt sponsor for English Rugby Union club London Wasps in a deal worth £1 Million. This was later extended until the end of the 2013 season.

Michael Ruettgers joined EMC in 1988 and served as CEO from 1992 until January 2001. Under Ruettgers' leadership, EMC revenues grew from $120 million to nearly $9 billion 10 years later, and the company shifted its focus from memory boards to storage systems.  Ruettgers was named one of BusinessWeeks "World's Top 25 Executives"; one of the "Best Chief Executive Officers in America" by Worth magazine; and one of Network Worlds "25 Most Powerful People in Networking".

Ahead of their acquisition by Dell, EMC gained a reputation for oppressive non-compete agreements and non-compete lobbying through AIM (Associated Industries of Massachusetts)

Acquisition by Dell

On October 12, 2015, Dell Inc. announced its intent to acquire EMC in a cash-and-stock deal valued at $67 billion, which as of 2021 remains the largest-ever acquisition in the technology sector. The combination of Dell's enterprise server, personal computer, and mobile businesses with EMC's enterprise storage business was a significant vertical merger of IT giants. Dell offered $24.05 per share of EMC, and $9.05 per share of tracking stock in VMware.

On September 7, 2016, Dell Inc. completed the merger, which involved the issuance of $45.9 billion in debt and $4.4 billion common stock. At the time, some analysts claimed that Dell's acquisition of the former
Iomega could harm the LenovoEMC partnership.

Products and services
In addition to those of the majority-owned Pivotal company, Dell EMC sells products and services, including products from other Dell Technologies companies, designed to allow IT departments to move to a cloud computing model and to analyze big data. LenovoEMC, formerly Iomega, sells storage products.

Major acquisitions
The following table includes the listing and timeline of EMC Corporation's major acquisitions of other companies since 1996.

Big data projects
In 2012, EMC sponsored The Human Face of Big Data, a globally crowdsourced media project focusing on the ability to collect, analyze, triangulate and visualize vast amounts of data in real-time. The Human Face of Big Data, produced by Rick Smolan and Jennifer Erwitt, includes "a number of fascinating stories ... [that] represent some of the most innovative applications of data that are shaping our future".

References

External links

 
1979 establishments in Massachusetts
2016 mergers and acquisitions
American companies established in 1979
Companies based in Hopkinton, Massachusetts
Companies based in Round Rock, Texas
Companies formerly listed on the New York Stock Exchange
Computer companies established in 1979
Computer companies of the United States
Computer storage companies
Customer communications management
Software companies based in Massachusetts
Software companies based in Texas
Software companies established in 1979
Software companies of the United States
Storage Area Network companies